MRTA may refer for:

 Túpac Amaru Revolutionary Movement, Peru (Spanish: Movimiento Revolucionario Túpac Amaru)
 Marijuana Regulation and Taxation Act, a 2021 New York state law legalizing recreational marijuana
 Marketable Record Title Act, a law affecting property title muniment
 Mass Rapid Transit Authority of Thailand
 Montachusett Regional Transit Authority, Massachusetts, United States